Cheirurina is a suborder of the trilobite order Phacopida. Known representatives range from the uppermost Cambrian (upper Furongian) to the end of the Middle Devonian (Givetian). Cheirurina is made up of a morphologically diverse group of related families.

References

 
Phacopida
Prehistoric animal suborders
Arthropod suborders
Cambrian trilobites
Ordovician trilobites
Silurian trilobites
Devonian trilobites
Furongian first appearances
Givetian extinctions